Vladimir Alexandrovich Efimkin (born December 2, 1981 in Kuybyshev) is a Russian retired professional road bicycle racer, who last rode alongside his twin brother Alexander Efimkin on . He had established himself as a solid all-around cyclist.

Biography
In 2005, his first year has a pro, Efimkin started with solid results in April and May, with a huge performance in the Four Days of Dunkirk, where he won a stage and almost won the overall classification, finishing second. However, his major title of the season only came in August, where he won the Volta a Portugal. After a fabulous breakaway in one of the queen stages, and benefiting from the passivity of the peloton (that were known to underrate the unknown Russian), he captured the yellow jersey and kept it until the end.

In 2006, he joined , but was used more as a domestique. His main achievement was a second place in the 10th stage of the Giro d'Italia and a 3rd place in the overall classification of the Vuelta a La Rioja.

Efimkin finally exploded in a major competition in 2007. After finishing 6th place in the Tour de Suisse, he made a great Vuelta a España, winning in the summit finish of the Lagos de Covadonga. He wore the golden jersey for some days and was able to finish in the 6th position of the overall.

In 2008, Efimkin joined the French  team, where he was one of the leaders for the Tour de France. It is possible he will be awarded a stage win from the 2008 Tour, having finished second to Riccardo Riccò during stage 9, with Riccò's subsequent positive doping test potentially disqualifying him of the victory. He finished in 11th place overall.

After one year of racing, he quit again.

Major results

2005
 1st overall and 1 stage Volta a Portugal
 2nd overall and 1 stage Four Days of Dunkirk
 1 stage and 4th overall Vuelta a Aragón
2006
 3rd overall Vuelta a La Rioja
2007
 1 stage, Vuelta a España
 6th overall, Vuelta a España
 1 stage, Euskal Bizikleta
 6th overall 2007 Tour de Suisse
2008
 11th overall  Tour de France
 1st, Stage 9
2009
Aggressive rider stage 4 2009 Tour Down Under

References

External links 

Russian male cyclists
1981 births
Living people
Russian Vuelta a España stage winners
Olympic cyclists of Russia
Cyclists at the 2008 Summer Olympics
Sportspeople from Samara, Russia
Volta a Portugal winners